Novellus Systems Inc. was a company founded by Brad Mattson that developed, manufactured, sold, and serviced semiconductor equipment used in the fabrication of integrated circuits. It was a supplier of chemical vapor deposition (CVD), plasma-enhanced chemical vapor deposition (PECVD), physical vapor deposition (PVD), electrochemical deposition (ECD), ultraviolet thermal processing (UVTP), and surface preparation equipment used in the manufacturing of semiconductors.

Novellus Systems was founded in 1984 and is headquartered in San Jose, California. The company maintains engineering & manufacturing facilities in Tualatin, Oregon and San Jose, California. Also, Novellus has a component design and software development facility in Bangalore, India.

In December 2011, Novellus agreed to be acquired by Lam Research for $3.3 billion. The acquisition was completed in June 2012.

Product lines
Novellus' product lines were called ALTUS, ATHENA, GAMMA, INOVA, SABRE, SOLA, SPEED, and VECTOR, SEQUEL and assisted semiconductor companies with manufacturing.

External links

References

Manufacturing companies based in San Jose, California
Technology companies based in the San Francisco Bay Area
Electronics companies of the United States
Electronics companies established in 1984
1984 establishments in California
Companies formerly listed on the Nasdaq
Equipment semiconductor companies
2012 mergers and acquisitions